Sofia Falcone is a villain appearing in DC Comics, primarily in association with the character Batman. Debuting in the 1996-97 comic book limited series Batman: The Long Halloween by Jeph Loeb and Tim Sale, she is introduced as a member of the Falcone crime family, who assists her father Carmine Falcone in unearthing the identity of the "Holiday Killer"—later revealed to be Sofia's own brother Alberto Falcone, a mass-murderer who had been indiscriminately killing Gotham City's citizens in correlation with holidays in the yearly calendar.  In the 1999-2000 limited series Batman: Dark Victory which served as a continuation of the arc established in The Long Halloween, Sofia is revealed as the identity behind the murderer known under the alias the Hangman, who had spent over a year targeting and eliminating various members of the Gotham City Police Department, notably in association with former district attorney-turned criminal, Harvey Dent / Two-Face, who ends up killing her during a lengthy confrontation with Batman himself.

The character made her live-action debut in the television series Gotham, portrayed by Crystal Reed. She will also appear in the upcoming HBO Max television series The Penguin set in The Batman shared universe, played by Cristin Milioti.

Publication history
Sofia Falcone first appeared in Jeph Loeb and Tim Sale's 1996 miniseries Batman: The Long Halloween as the daughter of crime lord Carmine Falcone. She returned in the sequel Batman: Dark Victory, where she became the Hangman killer to avenge her father's death.

Loeb stated in an interview that he paralleled the Falcone family to that of the Corleone family, with Sofia's temper matching that of Sonny Corleone.

Fictional character biography

The Long Halloween
When the Holiday killer started killing members of the Falcone family, Carmine has his daughter Sofia released from prison early to help him find who the killer was.

In the end the killer was apparently revealed to be Alberto Falcone, Carmine's son and Sofia's brother. Afterwards, Carmine was killed by Gotham's district attorney Harvey Dent, who became Two-Face after having his face splashed with acid, and Sofia fell out of the Falcone's penthouse window after being attacked by Catwoman.

Dark Victory
Sofia is revealed to have survived her fall, now in a wheelchair and wearing a neck brace, and is the new head of the Falcone family. Meanwhile, a new serial killer known as the Hangman is killing the cops of Gotham City with a noose, all of whom had a connection to Harvey Dent.

In the end, Sofia is revealed to be the killer, having faked her paralysis. She kills her brother Alberto for being a "disappointment" to the family, and then tries to kill Two-Face, but Batman stops her. While she is battling him, Two-Face shoots her in the head.

In other media

Television
 Sofia Falcone appears in Gotham, portrayed by Crystal Reed. The daughter of Carmine Falcone, and sister of Mario Calvi Falcone, she first appears in the fourth season episode "A Dark Knight: They Who Hide Behind Masks", where she teams up and begins an affair with Jim Gordon to take down Oswald Cobblepot, who has taken over Gotham City. She befriends Cobblepot and opens an orphanage in Gotham. Teaming up with the Gotham City Sirens, she later uses Cobblepot's friendship with an orphan boy to start a war against him. Also, she is revealed to have hired Professor Pyg, a serial killer who targets cops working for Cobblepot, and to have put out a hit that killed her own father. In addition, she orchestrates events that led to Cobblepot being remanded to Arkham Asylum, gains Victor Zsasz's allegiance, and kills Professor Pyg. She then blackmails Gordon into working for her. When Gordon goes back on their arrangement, she works to hurt him by pressuring her sister-in-law and Gordon's ex, Leslie Thompkins, into giving her control over the Narrows. When Thompkins refuses, Sofia breaks her hand with a hammer, and gives control of the Narrows to Thompkins' rival, Sampson. In the episode "A Dark Knight: The Sinking Ship, The Great Applause", Sofia leads Zsasz, Headhunter, and two Falcone crime family operatives to Spa Bo'sh Sumka to target Arthur Penn, her father's former accountant. While Zsasz and Headhunter go after Harvey Bullock and Penn, Sofia engages Gordon in a gunfight and seriously injures him. However, before Sofia can kill him, Thompkins shoots her in the head. As Gordon recuperates in the hospital, Bullock tells him that Sofia is in a coma.
 Sofia Falcone will be played by Cristin Milioti in The Penguin, a television spin-off to the 2022 film The Batman.

Film
 Sofia Falcone appears in Batman: The Long Halloween, Part Two, voiced by Laila Berzins.

Video games
 Sofia's name is mentioned on the Falcone family tree in Batman: Arkham Origins.

See also
List of Batman family enemies

References

Characters created by Jeph Loeb
Comics characters introduced in 1997
Fictional serial killers
DC Comics supervillains
DC Comics female supervillains
Fictional patricides
Fictional Italian American people
Fictional fratricides
Fictional murdered people